A police motorcycle is a motorcycle used by police and law enforcement. They may be custom designed to meet the requirements unique of a particular use. A police motorcycle is often called a "motor" by police officers in the United States. Units that use motorcycles are often called motorcycle units or motor units, and police officers assigned to these units are known as motorcycle officers or motor officers.

The maneuverability of the motorcycle on crowded streets offer advantages not provided by larger, more traditional police vehicles. The motorcycle's relatively small size allows it to get to accident scenes more quickly when incidents such as traffic collisions slow down access by four-wheel vehicles, and to access routes unavailable to other motor vehicles, such as narrow streets and footpaths. Police motorcycles are also used in police escorts for parades, funeral processions, motorcades, Olympic torch relays, and other events.

History 

Police officers have used motorcycles—primarily for the enforcement of traffic laws and as escort vehicles—since the early 20th century. Chief August Vollmer of the Berkeley Police Department is credited with organizing the first official police motorcycle patrol in the United States in 1911. However, several police forces around the country reported using motorcycles as patrol vehicles earlier. Harley-Davidson credits Detroit, Michigan as being the first purchaser of police motorcycles in 1908. The police department in Evanston, Illinois also purchased a belt-driven motorcycle for its first motorcycle police officer in 1908, and the Portland Police Bureau had a police officer who used his personal motorcycle to patrol the city as early as 1909.The role of the motorcycle as inexpensive public transportation evolved in the 1930s, and their use by police and the armed forces also grew, providing a stable production market for the more utilitarian machines, especially as Europe rearmed after World War I.

Motorcycles used 

 police departments in the United States typically use purpose-built motorcycles marketed by Harley-Davidson, Kawasaki, or BMW Motorrad. Kawasaki police motorcycles, which were built for the US market in Lincoln, Nebraska, ceased production in September 2005.  However, the Kawasaki Concours 14 is being modified and marketed for police use in some markets.

In Germany, BMW Motorrad is the largest provider of motorcycles for authority use.

In the United Kingdom, the most common police motorcycles are the BMW R1200RT and the Yamaha FJR1300. UK police forces have withdrawn the Honda ST1300 Pan-European since the death of an officer was blamed on the machine. Some police forces also use scooters within towns for parking enforcement, or special-purpose machines such as unmarked (covert), or off-road motorcycles.

Of the British manufacturers themselves, Triumph motorcycles, built at Meriden, were used by many British (including the Metropolitan Police) and Commonwealth police forces until 1983 when the factory closed. From the late 1940s, Triumph was also, for a time, the choice of the Parisian police, a fact promoted in a factory-produced movie, It's A Triumph !. The police version of the 650cc 6T Triumph Thunderbird was nicknamed the SAINT, an acronym of "Stops Anything In No Time". By the mid-1970s, with industrial problems and closures affecting their spares supply and service, Triumphs and other British marques were increasingly replaced by the smoother BMW R80 (and to a more limited extent, Norton Interpols) than by then-current Triumph police bikes. In an attempt to win back orders from BMW, Meriden marketed Triumph Bonneville and Tiger models of 750cc size with anti-vibration mountings as well as electric starting but these still only achieved limited sales success. In 1981, the UK newspaper, Motor Cycle News, reported Derbyshire's Chief Constable comparing these Triumphs very unfavorably to BMW, in particular, its anti-vibration engine mounts. Supported by an article in rival publication, Motor Cycle Weekly, this criticism was strongly refuted by the factory and Derbyshire eventually accepted evaluation of police versions of the new Triumph T140W TSS in anti-vibration mounts. Norton's Commando Interpol and later Wankel rotary engine Interpol 2 motorcycle were used by some British forces until that firm's collapse in the early 1990s. Other marques such as BSA were used by some forces, although only the Velocette LE "noddy-bike" model proved as popular with the police as the Triumphs.

In 2008, BMW claimed to be the largest seller of motorcycles for authority use, as more than 100,000 BMW motorcycles were in official use in over 150 countries on five continents. In 2007, BMW sold 4,284 police motorcycles worldwide. BMW produces factory built police-specific models such as the R1200RT-P and R900RT-P. More than 225 U.S. law enforcement agencies, including the California Highway Patrol, have BMW authority motorcycles in their fleets of patrol vehicles. The new BMW bikes outperformed the aging Harley-Davidson fleet.

Harley-Davidson has maintained a long relationship with police departments and law-enforcement agencies in some countries. For the 2009 model year, Harley-Davidson offers the Harley-Davidson FLHTP Electra Glide, the FLHP Road King, the XL883 Sportster and the new XB12XP Buell Ulysses Police motorcycle. The FLHTP Electra Glide and the FLHP Road King are also offered as Fire/Rescue motorcycles.

In 2014, the Los Angeles Police Department added the Zero Motorcycles MMX electric motorcycle to its fleet. The motorcycle was praised over the traditional bulky Harley-Davidson and BMW bikes for its stealth, low operational costs, immediate tactical advantage, and low environmental footprint.

Gallery

See also
Blood bike
Fire motorcycle
Motorcycle ambulance
Motorcycle training
Electra Glide in Blue, 1973 film about a motorcycle officer
CHiPs, 1977–1983 American television series about motorcycle officers
Magnum Force, 1973 film with a plot centered around corrupt motorcycle officers

References

External links 
Motorcycle Patrol TELEMASP Bulletin, Texas Law Enforcement Management and Administrative Statistics Program

Motorcycle
Utility motorcycles